Special K is an American brand of breakfast cereal and meal bars manufactured by Kellogg's. The cereal was introduced to the United States in 1955. It is made primarily from grains such as lightly toasted rice, wheat and barley. Special K used to be marketed primarily as a low-fat cereal that can be eaten to help one lose weight.

Special K Challenge 
The Special K brand previously advocated the "Special K Challenge." The goal of this challenge was to help an individual lose six pounds in two weeks; this loss was achieved by eating specific Special K products throughout the day. The diet began with a single serving of any Special K cereal, accompanied with 2/3 cup of skim milk and a side of fruit. The second meal of the diet included either a Special K Protein Meal Bar, Special K Protein Shake, or another serving of Special K cereal with 2/3 cup of skim milk and a side of fruit. The third meal of the day could be consumed normally, without any Special K restrictions. Throughout the day, an individual is allotted two Special K snacking times, eating any of the following specified snacks: Special K Protein Meal Bars, Special K Protein Shakes, Special K Breakfast Shakes, Special K Protein Granola Bars, Special K Crackers, Special K Cracker Chips, or Special K Popcorn. For any additional snack servings, an individual could consume fruits and vegetables. During the challenge, drinks could be consumed normally.

Critics of the Special K diet feel that it may leave dieters feeling hungry because of its limited food options and deter people from sticking to the diet. The diet has been criticised for being too low in protein, fiber, vegetables, and fruits. The diet does not include guidance on how to change unhealthy overeating or lack of exercise and their importance to permanent weight loss.

Nutrition
In the United States, Special K Original has 120 calories per 31g cup serving. One serving contains 0.5g fat, 23g carbohydrates, 4g sugar, and 6g protein. In the United Kingdom, Special K Original is 17% sugar, meaning a 30g serving contains 5g of sugar.

In the UK, an advertising campaign has focused on the results of a study run in collaboration with the Department of Human Sciences at Loughborough University, requiring overweight volunteer subjects to replace two meals a day with a bowl of the cereal.
 The study found that after 2 weeks, up to 75% of subjects had slimmer waists and hips. The university's scientists concluded that the majority of this was due to fat loss.

Varieties
In the US, Special K cereal currently comes in fifteen different varieties: Original, Chocolatey Delight, Chocolatey Strawberry, Cinnamon Pecan, Red Berries, Vanilla Almond, Fruit & Yogurt, Brown Sugar Gluten Free, Oats & Honey, Touch of Honey Granola, Chocolate Almond, Cranberry Granola, Protein, Cinnamon Sugar Crunch Protein, Blueberry Lemon, and
Apple Cinnamon Crunch (Seasonal).

In the UK & Ireland, Special K cereal comes in ten different varieties:
Original, Red Berries, Hazelnut & Almond, Milk Chocolate, Strawberry and Chocolate, Fruit & Nut, Creamy Berry Crunch, Peach & Apricot, and
Yoghurty.

Meal replacement

In the US, Special K provides meal replacements in two forms: protein meal bars and protein shakes.

There are eleven varieties of Special K Protein Meal Bars: Mocha Crunch Protein, Chocolate Peanut Butter, Strawberry, Double Chocolate, Chocolatey Chip, Honey Almond, Cranberry Walnut, Chocolate Caramel, Chocolatey Brownie, and Chocolatey Dipped Mint.

There are eight varieties of Special K Protein Shakes: Milk Chocolate, Strawberry, French Vanilla, Rich Chocolate, Strawberry Banana,  Chocolate Mocha, Vanilla Cappuccino, and Raspberry Cheesecake.

Snacks
Kellogg's Special K snacks are marketed as low-fat alternatives to regular snacks.  There are several varieties of Special K snacks, including Special K Protein Granola Bars, Special K Breakfast Shakes, Special K Cereal Bars, Special K CrackerChips, Special K Popcorn, and Special K Crackers.

There are four varieties of Special K Protein Granola Bars: Chocolatey Peanut Butter, Dark Chocolate, Greek Yogurt & Fruit, and Almond Honey Oat.

There are five varieties of Special K Breakfast Shakes: Chocolate Mocha Coffee House, Vanilla Cappuccino Coffee House, Chocolate Delight,
Red Berries, and French Vanilla.

There are two varieties of Special K Cereal Bars: Red Berries, and Chocolatey Pretzel.

There are five varieties of Special K Cracker Chips: Sea Salt, Cheddar, Sour Cream & Onion, Barbecue, and Salt & Vinegar.

There are two varieties of Special K Popcorn: Kettle Corn and White Cheddar.

There is one variety of Special K Crackers: Multi-grain.

Beverages

Special K2O Protein Water

Kellogg's Special K2O Protein Water was a beverage released in September 2006 by the Kellogg Company. It was produced in several flavors and has been marketed as a weight-control and weight-loss product. The product was re-launched in 2007 by the Kellogg Company. The product is no longer available. Special K2O Protein Water was available in several flavors, including Strawberry Kiwi, Lemon Twist, and Tropical Blend. Marketed as a low-calorie alternative protein drink, a 16-ounce bottle of K2O contains 5 grams of protein, 10% DV of calcium, and 50 calories. The product has also been marketed as a weight-loss product, and has been marketed as part of "The Special K Challenge" and "Feeling good never looked better" advertising campaigns.

On August 15, 2007, Kellogg's re-launched Special K2O Protein Water with enhanced graphics and a new flavor, Mixed Berry.  In addition to the 5 grams of protein, the product was formulated with 5 grams of soluble fiber, from polydextrose, and 20% DV each of vitamins B3 (Niacin), B6, and B12 while maintaining 50 calories. The product was also manufactured in a powdered form as a drink mix that is sold in packets, which is then added to water. The powdered product has 30 calories, 5 grams of fiber and 5 grams of protein per serving. The powdered mix has also been marketed as a weight-control product.

Special K Protein Shakes
Kellogg's produces Special K Protein Shakes.

Controversies

Canada 
Until mid-2014, Kellogg's used a special Special K formula that was different in Canada from that used in the U.S. With the June 2014 closure of Kellogg's London, Ontario plant, Canadians now eat Special K that is made in the U.S. This formulation was similar to the original Special K introduced in the US in 1955.

Denmark 
Denmark has outlawed the addition of vitamins in Kellogg's products since 2004. Danish health officials banned cereals containing added vitamins because they claimed Kellogg's Special K wanted to add extremely high levels of vitamin B6, calcium, folic acid, and iron, which would reach toxic levels when eaten on a daily basis. Young children risk liver and kidney damage while the fetuses of pregnant women could suffer complications.

The Netherlands 
In an episode aired on October 15, 2009, the Dutch television show , followed up one of Kellogg's Special K nutritional claims, namely the addition of iron. The show provided evidence that the iron was not nutritional ionic iron—as it occurs in natural foods like spinach—but was, in fact, metallic iron.  The nutritional experts in the show agreed that metallic iron should not be part of a diet. After the airing, the Dutch food authority nuanced the claims made in the TV program, claiming there are no health risks. They also challenged the claim that the cereal could contain "shredded bites," and responded that iron powder is suitable for human consumption.

United States 
In late February 2013, the company recalled three sizes of the Special K Red Berries in the US which might contain pieces of glass.

References

Further reading
 
 "Kellogg's. (Supplier News) (K2O Protein Water Mix)". Drug Store News.

External links

 

Kellogg's brands
Kellogg's cereals
Products introduced in 1955
Bottled water brands
Brand name diet products
Cereal bars
Non-alcoholic drinks